The Saint Augustine Major Seminary or SASMA is a Catholic, formation seminary of the Apostolic Vicariate of Calapan, Oriental Mindoro located in Tagaytay, Cavite, Philippines. The seminarians of SASMA attend to their academics at the Divine Word Seminary.

References

Catholic seminaries
Buildings and structures in Tagaytay